Circulation Verification Council (CVC) is an American company which acts as an auditor to create circulation data for various periodicals.  A common use of their services would be in providing demographic information about the readers of a publication so that the publishers and advertisers would be able to design content for the audience reading that specific publication.

Corporate history
Tim Bingaman founded CVC in 1992.  He is currently the president and CEO.

Business model
CVC is a for-profit company.

References

External links
official site

Newspapers circulation audit